Bodzanta or Bodzęta (1320–1388) of Szeliga coat of arms was an archbishop of Gniezno (1382–1388), Polish noble, governor of Kraków–Sandomierz lands (1350, 1357–1370, 1372–1379, 1381).

Supporter of Louis I of Hungary and the Angevin dynasty. After his death, he first supported an Angevin candidate for the throne of the Kingdom of Poland, and than, Siemowit IV, Duke of Masovia. On 16 June 1383, he proclaimed Siemowit the king of Poland, but due to lack of support for Siemowit, he withdrew his support, embracing the idea of a Polish–Lithuanian union. On 15 February, Bodzanta baptised Lithuanian Grand Duke Jogaila, who became the king Władysław II Jagiełło. On 18 February, he presided over his marriage with Jadwiga of Poland, and on 4 March he crowned him the king of Poland.

References

External links 
Jan Tęgowski: Postawa polityczna arcybiskupa gnieźnieńskiego Bodzanty w czasie bezkrólewia po śmierci Ludwika Węgierskiego.
 Virtual tour Gniezno Cathedral  

1320s births
1388 deaths
Archbishops of Gniezno